Nei or Inner Lingding Island, formerly romanized as Lintin or  is an island in the Pearl River estuary in the southeastern Chinese province of Guangdong. Although it is located closer to the eastern (Hong Kong and Shenzhen) shore of the estuary, it was until 2009 administratively part of the prefecture-level city of Zhuhai, whose main administrative center is located on the west shore of the river. The jurisdiction of Nei Lingding Island was handed over to Shenzhen in 2009.

History 
In May 1513, the Portuguese explorer Jorge Álvares arrived at an island near the coast of China they called "Tamão". This was the first contact of Europeans with China via the sea route around the Cape of Good Hope. Tamão was fortified by Simão de Andrade and reclaimed by the Chinese during the expulsion of the Portuguese in the 1520s. Western scholarship, following J. M. Braga, generally contends that this "Tamão" is Nei Lingding, the main island in the mouth of the Pearl River, 6 km off the coast of the mainland.  Recent Chinese scholarship finds this identification to be insufficiently proven, however, and suggests a number of other potential islands including the nearby and far larger Lantau Island.

As of 1814 Nei Lingding (then romanized as "Lintin") was called the "outer anchorage" for European ships traveling to Canton (Guangzhou). They would have to stop at the island, have their cargo inspected and measured by the Chinese customs officials stationed at the island, and pay customs duties. In 1821, when the Chinese government prohibited importation of opium into the country's ports, Lintin became a base for drug smugglers; hulks of old boats, anchored near the island, served as warehouses and depots where imported opium would be reloaded onto smaller boats to be smuggled into Guangzhou and other ports. Edmund Roberts visited the island in 1832, and noted that there were "seven to eight ships" smuggling opium, including American boats. From the 1830s until the cession of Hong Kong in the 1840s, Lintin Island was the main base for British merchants in the Pearl River Delta area. The island was also a stopping point during monsoon season for ship repair. Ships would stay on the island upwards of six months.

Demographics
As of 1814, the population was estimated to be less than 60; in 1821, just under 2,000. When Edmund Roberts visited in 1832, he noted a population of approximately 5,000.

Nature reserve 
Since 1984, a part of the island has been designated the "Neilingding Island and Futian (福田) Nature Reserve".

See also 

References

Islands of Guangdong
Islands of the Pearl River (China)
Nature reserves in China
Geography of Shenzhen
Populated places in China
Islands of China